Ricardo Gomez or Ricardo Gómez may refer to:

 Ricardo Ernesto Gómez (born 1981),  Argentine football midfielder
 Ricardo Gómez Pérez (born 1952), Venezuelan photographer
 Ricardo Gómez Diez (born 1949), Argentine politician
 Ricardo Gómez (soccer) (born 1995), American soccer player
 Ricardo Gómez Campuzano (1891-1981), Colombian artist

See also
 Richard Gomez
 Richard Gómez